Rohana Muthalib (1900 — 7 April 1983) was an Indonesian female beauty expert who served as the mayor of Pontianak from 1952 until 1956.

Early and personal life
She was a Malay.

Career
Prior to her appointment as the Mayor of Pontianak, Muthalib worked as a beauty expert. She graduated with a cosmetology degree from the Cor van der Leeuw Institute. Muthalib became the first Indonesian to become a cosmetologist after her graduation.

Muthalib was appointed as the Mayor of Pontianak by the Minister of Internal Affairs Mohammad Roem in 1952. She was one of the two female mayors appointed during Roem's term. Muthalib was the first female to serve as the mayor of Pontianak. She served for four years until 1956. Muthalib was credited by Roem for fixing "minor but important" problems in the city, such as garbage problems and potholes. On one occasion, Muthalib was reported to have spent 250 thousand rupiahs for the extension of eight main roads in the city, reparation of bridges and improvement of pavements.

During her term, she faced protests from trade unions affiliated with the Central All-Indonesian Workers Organization. The trade unions demanded a raise. However — as Roem described it — she handled the protesters "like her own children" and managed to subdue the demand.

In 1954, Muthalib held the city's first press exhibition. The exhibition, which was organized by the Pembangunan newspaper, displayed thousands of daily publications and magazines.

At the end of her term — between 1955 and 1956 — Muthalib embarked on a program to provide the city with clean water.

After her resignation from the mayoral office, she stated that "It is easier to sit in a beauty salon than to sit as a mayor."

She lived in the city of Bandung (West Java) after retirement. Since 1978, Muthalib underwent several treatments in the hospital due to complications. Muthalib died at 23:00 on 7 April 1983 in Jakarta. She was buried at a cemetery in Bogor.

She was married to Abdul Muthalib, a civil engineer. The marriage resulted in five children (four sons, one daughter), the daughter was Nani Razak, a famous Indonesian female lawyer.

The main hall at the Pontianak City Development Planning Agency is named after Muthalib.

References 

1900 births
1983 deaths
Mayors and regents of places in West Kalimantan
People from Pontianak
Women mayors of places in Indonesia
Mayors of places in Indonesia